Həmyəli (also, Həmjəli) is a village and municipality in the Shamakhi Rayon of Azerbaijan.  It has a population of 1102.

References 

Populated places in Shamakhi District